Ruben Pols (born 3 November 1994 in Geraardsbergen) is a Belgian former cyclist, who rode professionally for the  in 2013 and  in 2016 and 2017.

Major results

2014
 2nd Time trial, National Under-23 Road Championships
 7th Grand Prix des Marbriers
 10th Overall Le Triptyque des Monts et Châteaux
2015
 1st  Time trial, National Under-23 Road Championships
 6th Time trial, UEC European Under-23 Road Championships

References

External links

1994 births
Living people
Belgian male cyclists
People from Geraardsbergen
Cyclists from East Flanders
21st-century Belgian people